Hans-Jürgen Stefan Schwarz (born 18 April 1969) is a Swedish former professional footballer who played as a midfielder. Schwarz started off his career with Malmö FF in 1987 before moving on to represent Benfica, Arsenal, Fiorentina, and Valencia until he retired at Sunderland in 2003. Schwarz won 69 caps for the Sweden national team, scoring 6 goals. He represented his country at the 1990 FIFA World Cup, UEFA Euro 1992, and most notably the 1994 FIFA World Cup where Sweden finished third.

Club career 
Born to a German father in the city of Malmö, Schwarz started his playing career as a midfielder with Kulladals FF's academy. Between 1985 and 1987, he spent two seasons with Bayer Leverkusen's youth team. He made his debut as a professional footballer with his hometown club Malmö FF. He then moved to Benfica for the 1990–91 season to play under manager Sven-Göran Eriksson. Schwarz was a regular selection for Benfica for the following four seasons, won Primeira Liga twice, and played in the side that knocked Arsenal out of the European Cup in 1991.

He subsequently moved to London to play for Arsenal in the summer of 1994 for £1.8 million. He would grow frustrated with George Graham's tactics during the season and wanted to be utilised in more of an attacking sense in the team. The Gunners struggled in the league that season, but they reached the final of the 1995's UEFA Cup Winners' Cup. That dramatic extra-time defeat to Real Zaragoza was Schwarz's last game for Arsenal. He left Highbury after just one season at the club.

Schwarz completed his £2.5 million transfer to Fiorentina. He spent three seasons in Italy, lifting the Coppa Italia and Super Cup. In the summer 1998 he reunited with Cladio Ranieri and moved to Spain and Valencia, where he only spent a year, before joining English side Sunderland 29 July 1999 for a club record fee, £3.75 million. The club inserted a "Space Clause" in his contract, that stated that if he were to travel into space his contract would become wholly invalid.

He was bestowed with the Guldbollen in November 1999, Sweden's award for the year's best footballer. Schwarz was an aggressive midfielder who kept it simple on the ball, but his experience was crucial for newly promoted Sunderland, who finished an impressive 7th. place in the Premier League. They repeated the feat the following season.

Schwarz, at an age of 33, fell out with manager Peter Reid and appeared to have no future at Sunderland after he was put on the transfer list in the summer 2002. But with Sunderland suffering from a shortage of midfielders, Schwarz came off the bench for the final 25 minutes of the League Cup tie at Sheffield United 3 December 2002, and it was his last appearance for the club. Former Sweden captain had already been brought in from the cold under new manager Howard Wilkinson, who gave him a coaching role shortly after his arrival. Schwarz finally retired in March 2003.

International career
After having represented the Sweden U17, U19, and U21 teams, Schwarz made his full international debut for Sweden on 14 February 1990 as a substitute in a friendly game against the United Arab Emirates where he replaced Pontus Kåmark in the 80th minute before also scoring his first international goal in a 1–1 draw. A few months later he appeared in his first major tournament for Sweden as he played in all three games at left back as Sweden was eliminated from the 1990 FIFA World Cup after the group stage.

In 1992, Schwarz appeared in three games as Sweden progressed to the semi-finals of UEFA Euro 1992 before being eliminated by West Germany. In 1994, he played in centre midfield alongside Jonas Thern as Sweden finished third at the 1994 FIFA World Cup. An injury to his Achilles tendon kept him out of the squad for UEFA Euro 2000.

He declared his international retirement in August 2001 to focus on his club team after a series of injuries while with the national team. His last international appearance came in a 2002 FIFA World Cup qualifier against Moldova on 28 March 2001.

Schwarz won a total of 69 caps during his career, scoring six goals.

Career statistics 

Scores and results list Sweden's goal tally first, score column indicates score after each Schwarz goal.

Honours
Malmö
Swedish Championship: 1988
Allsvenskan: 1987, 1988
Svenska Cupen: 1989

Benfica
Primeira Divisão: 1990–91, 1993–94
Taça de Portugal: 1992–93

Arsenal
UEFA Cup Winners' Cup: Runner-up 1994–95

Fiorentina
Coppa Italia: 1995–96
Supercoppa Italiana: 1996

Valencia
UEFA Intertoto Cup: 1998
Copa del Rey: 1998–99
Sweden
FIFA World Cup third place: 1994
Individual
"Man of the tournament" – Makita Tournament: 1994
Guldbollen: 1999

References

External links
 

1969 births
Living people
1990 FIFA World Cup players
UEFA Euro 1992 players
1994 FIFA World Cup players
ACF Fiorentina players
Allsvenskan players
Arsenal F.C. players
S.L. Benfica footballers
Expatriate footballers in England
Expatriate footballers in Germany
Expatriate footballers in Italy
Expatriate footballers in Portugal
Swedish expatriate sportspeople in Portugal
La Liga players
Malmö FF players
Primeira Liga players
Premier League players
Serie A players
Sunderland A.F.C. players
Swedish footballers
Footballers from Skåne County
Sweden international footballers
Sweden under-21 international footballers
Sweden youth international footballers
Swedish expatriate footballers
Swedish expatriate sportspeople in England
Swedish expatriate sportspeople in Spain
Swedish expatriate sportspeople in Germany
Swedish expatriate sportspeople in Italy
Valencia CF players
Association football midfielders
Swedish people of German descent